Captain is a rank or title for commander of a military unit, commander of a ship or other vessel, or leader of a unit or organization.

Captain or The Captain may also refer to:

Rank
Captain (armed forces), a commissioned officer rank historically corresponding to the command of a company of soldiers
Captain (naval), rank corresponding to command of the largest ships in English-speaking navies
Captain (Canadian army and air force)
Captain (D) or Captain Destroyers, a shore-based commander in the Royal Navy of the United Kingdom
Captain (D) afloat, a related rank
Group captain, senior commissioned rank in the air forces of many countries
Sea captain, high grade licensed mariner in ultimate command of the vessel
Kapitän, shortened version of several ranks in the German navy
Pilot in command, the lead pilot on an aircraft

Film and television
 Captain (1994 film), a Telugu-Tamil bilingual film
 Captain (1999 film), a Malayalam film
 Captain (2018 film), a Malayalam film
 Captain (2019 film), a Nepalese film
 Captain (2022 film), a Tamil-language film
 The Captain (1946 film), a French film
 The Captain (1971 film), a German film
 The Captain (2017 film), a German film
 The Captain (2019 film), a Chinese film
 The Captain (miniseries), a 2022 American television miniseries
 The Captains (film), a 2011 documentary about captains in the Star Trek series
 Captain, a non-rail vehicle in Thomas & Friends
 The Captain, a minor character in The Hitchhiker's Guide to the Galaxy
 The Captain, the main character in Captain Kangaroo
 Vijayakanth or Captain, Indian actor

Literature
 The Captain (play), a 1647 stage play by Francis Beaumont and John Fletcher
 The Captain (novel), a 1967 novel by Jan de Hartog
 The Captain (magazine), a British magazine for boys

Comics and manga
 Captain (Hellsing), a character from the Hellsing manga and OVA
 Captain (manga), a 1972 baseball manga series by Akio Chiba
 Captain (comics), a satiric superhero from the comic book Nextwave

Music

Artists and composers
 Captain (band), a London-based alternative rock band
 Daryl Dragon or Captain, part of Captain & Tennille
 Carl Fontana or the Captain, American jazz trombonist
 Markus Kaarlonen or Captain, Finnish musician 
 Sergey Kuryokhin or the Captain, Russian composer
 Saki Shimizu or Captain, J-pop singer

Albums
 Captain (album), a 1998 album by Idlewild
 The Captain (album), the 1999 album by Kasey Chambers

Songs
"The Captain" (Kasey Chambers song) (1999)
"The Captain" (Biffy Clyro song) (2009)
"The Captain" (Leonard Cohen song) (1984)
"The Captain" (Guster song) (2006)
"The Captain" (The Knife song) (2006)
"Captain", by Wiz Khalifa; see Wiz Khalifa discography

Ships
 HMS Captain (1678), a 70-gun third rate
 HMS Captain (1743), a 70-gun third rate
 HMS Captain (1787), a 74-gun third rate
 HMS Carnatic (1783), a 72-gun third rate renamed Captain in 1815
 HMS Royal Sovereign (1786), a 100-gun first rate renamed Captain in 1825
 HMS Agincourt  (1865), an iron screw ship that was to have been named Captain
 HMS Captain (1869), a masted turret ship
 Captain-class frigates, a class of Royal Navy frigates

Sports
 Captain (sports), the leader of an athletic team
 Captain (association football), a member chosen to be the on-pitch leader of the team
 Captain (Australian rules football), a player who has several additional roles and responsibilities
 Captain (cricket), the appointed leader of a team
 Captain (ice hockey), the player authorized to speak with the game officials regarding rule interpretations
 Captain (baseball), an honorary title sometimes given to a member of the team to acknowledge his leadership
 Captains, the sports teams of Christopher Newport University
 "The Captain", a nickname for hockey player Steve Yzerman
 "The Captain", a nickname for baseball player Derek Jeter

Other uses
 Captain (videotex), a Japanese videotex system, operational from 1983 to 2002
 Marion 6360, a power shovel known as "The Captain"
 "The Captain", a nickname for the fascist Iron Guard leader Corneliu Zelea Codreanu
 Captain (restaurant), responsible for interacting with guests and directing waiters
 "Captain", a nickname for Captain Amarinder Singh, former Chief Minister of Punjab

See also
 Capitaine (disambiguation)
 Capitan (disambiguation)
 Chieftain (disambiguation)
 El Capitan (disambiguation), Spanish for "The Captain"
 Il Capitano, a masked character from the commedia dell'arte
 CAPT (disambiguation)
 CPT (disambiguation)
 First Captain (disambiguation)
 HMS Captain, a list of Royal Navy ships
 Kapitan (disambiguation)
 Second Captain (disambiguation)

Captains